This is a list of shows that have aired on the cable network Warner TV. Shows currently aired on the network are in bold.

0–9
The 100
2 Broke Girls (currently seen in France, also streaming on HBO Max)
4 Blocks
36th People's Choice Awards
37th People's Choice Awards
38th People's Choice Awards (live telecast)
39th People's Choice Awards (live telecast)
40th People's Choice Awards (live telecast)
63rd Primetime Emmy Awards (live telecast)
64th Golden Globe Awards (live telecast)
64th Primetime Emmy Awards (live telecast)
65th Primetime Emmy Awards (live telecast)
66th Primetime Emmy Awards (live telecast)

A
A to Z
Ace Ventura: Pet Detective
Adult Swim (currently streaming on HBO Max)
Alcatraz
ALF (currently streaming on HBO Max, except United States)
Alice
Aliens in America
All Elite Wrestling
Almost Human
America's Best Dance Crew
Animaniacs (Coming soon currently in Italy, currently streaming on HBO Max in Latin America)
Animal Kingdom (In Brazil seen on AMC)
Angel From Hell
Angie Tribeca  (In Brazil seen on TBS)
Are You There, Chelsea?
Arrow
Aqua Teen Hunger Force (currently streaming on HBO Max)

B
The Bachelor
The Bachelorette 
Batman: The Animated Series (currently seen on Italy, also streaming on HBO Max)
Batman Beyond
Batwoman (also seen on HBO and HBO Max)
The Bedford Diaries
Beetlejuice
Believe
Better With You
Bewitched
Bipolar (seen only in Brazil)
Bosch (seen only in Germany)
Blade: The Series
Bleach
Blindspot
Boruto: Naruto Next Generations (only in Latin America, also seen on HBO Max)
Bluff City Law (seen only in Germany)
The Brady Bunch
Brooklyn 9-9

C
Californication (currently seen on TNT Series)
Cane
The Cat&Birdy Warneroonie PinkyBrainy Big Cartoonie Show
Chase
Chuck
The Class
Claws
The Client
Close to Home
Club House
Cold Case (currently in Brazil seen on A&E)
Complete Savages

D
Dallas (2012)
Death Note
Deep in the City
Detention
Diff'rent Strokes
Documentários Cultura Pop (seen only in Brazil)
Dragon Ball Super (also seen on Cartoon Network)
Dragon Ball Z Kai (also seen on Cartoon Network)
Droopy

E
E-Ring
Eagleheart
Eight Is Enough (seen only in Italy)
Eleventh Hour
The Ellen DeGeneres Show 
ER (currently seen on TNT Series, also streaming on HBO Max)
Everwood
The Evidence

F
The Facts of Life
Fastlane
La Femme Nikita
Flashpoint
Forever
Four Kings
Freakazoid! (currently streaming on HBO Max in Latin America, and coming soon currently in Italy)
Freddie
Friends (currently streaming on HBO Max)
Fringe
Full House

G
Gilmore Girls
Gimme a Break!
Go On
God Friended Me
Golden Boy
Gossip Girl (2007) (currently streaming in HBO Max)
Gossip Girl (2021) (also streaming in HBO Max)
Gotham (currently seen in Italy)
Ground Floor
Growing Pains (currently seen in Italy)

H
Happy Days
Harry's Law
Hercules: The Legendary Journeys
Histeria!
Harry Potter: Howgarts Tournament of Houses (also seen on Cartoon Network and streaming on HBO Max)
Hostages
Hot Streets
Human Target

I
I Dream of Jeannie
I Hate My Teenage Daughter
Invasion

J
Jesse
Joey
Justice

K
Knight Rider

L
The L Word
The Last O.G.
Latitudes (seen only in Brazil and also seen on TNT and Glitz*)
Laverne & Shirley
Legacies  (also streaming on HBO Max) 
Legends of Tomorrow
Life is Wild
Line of Duty
Lois & Clark: The New Adventures of Superman (currently seen in Italy, also streaming on HBO Max)
Looney Tunes (currently streaming on HBO Max, and coming soon currently in Italy)

M
Men in Trees
Men of a Certain Age
The Mentalist  (currently seen on TNT Series)
Metalocalypse (currently streaming on HBO Max)
The Middle 
Mike & Molly
Miracle Workers (also streaming on HBO Max)
Mission Hill
Modern Men
 Mom  (also streaming on HBO Max)
 Monk (seen only in Germany)
Mortal Kombat Conquest
Ms Fisher's Modern Murder Mysteries (seen only in France)

N
Naruto 
Narcos 
Narcos: Mexico (seen only in Germany)
The New Adventures of Old Christine (currently streaming on HBO Max)
Nikita (currently seen in Italy)
The Nine
Notes from the Underbelly

O
The O.C. 
Odd Man Out
Off Centre
Orphan Black
The Opposite Sex
Outsourced

P
Para we are King  (also streaming on HBO Max)
Person of Interest
Pinky and the Brain (Currently streaming on HBO Max in Latin America and coming soon currently in Italy)
Pinky, Elmyra and the Brain (currently in Latin America streaming on HBO Max)
Police Academy: The Animated Series (Coming soon currently in Italy in particular)
Presidio Med
Privileged
Project Blue Book (seen only on France)
Providence
Pushing Daisies
Pussycat Dolls Present

Q 
 Queer You Are (also streaming on HBO Max)

R
Raised by Wolves (also streaming on HBO Max)
Related
Resurrection Blvd.
Reunion
Rick and Morty (currently streaming on HBO Max)
Riverdale (only in Latin America)
Rizzoli & Isles
Robot Chicken  (currently streaming on HBO Max)
Rodney
Rush Hour

S
S.O.S. Pé na Bunda (seen only in Brazil)
The Secret Circle
The Secret Lives of Men
SEAL Team (seen only in Germany)
Search Party (currently streaming on HBO Max)
Seinfeld
Selfie
$#*! My Dad Says
Six Feet Under (currently streaming on HBO Max)
Skin
Smallville (currently seen in Italy)
Smith
The Sopranos (currently streaming on HBO Max)
Spenser For Hire
Stargirl
Step by Step
Studio 60 on the Sunset Strip
Suburgatory
Suddenly Susan
Super Fun Night
Super Friends
Supergirl
Superman: The Animated Series (currently streaming on HBO Max)
Supernatural (currently streaming on HBO Max)
Superstore
Surviving Jack
The Swan
The Sylvester and Tweety Mysteries (In Latin America currently streaming on HBO Max)

T
Taz-Mania (coming soon currently in Italy)
Terminator: The Sarah Connor Chronicles
The Big Bang Theory (currently seen in France, also streaming on HBO Max)
The Detour 
The Dukes of Hazzard
The Flash (1990)
The Flash (2014)
The Flight Attendant (also streaming on HBO Max)
The Fresh Prince of Bel-Air (seen previously in France and currently in Italy, also streaming on HBO Max)
The Huckleberry Hound Show (seen only on Italy)
The Mysteries of Laura
The Shivering Truth (currently streaming on HBO Max)
The Vampire Diaries (currently streaming in HBO Max)
Thieves
Third Watch (currently seen in Italy)
ThunderCats
Tiny Toon Adventures (Currently streaming in HBO Max on Latin America and coming soon currently in Italy)
Titans
TMZ
Touched by an Angel
Transplant (seen on France)
Trauma
Traveler
Twins
Two and a Half Men (currently streaming in HBO Max)
Two of a Kind
The X-Files (seen in Germany)

U
Undateable

V
V
Vengeance Unlimited
Veronica's Closet
Vida de Estagiário (seen only in Brazil)
Visitors (seen only in France)

W
Warehouse 13
Webster
The West Wing
What I Like About You
Who's the Boss?
Wipeout
Witchblade
Without a Trace
Working
Wrecked

Y
Yashahime: Princess Half-Demon (also seen in HBO Max)
Young Sheldon (also seen in HBO Max)

Footnotes

Notes

Warner Channel